The 2009 Lory Meagher Cup was the inaugural fourth-tier hurling competition organised by the Gaelic Athletic Association. Seven county teams and one regional team took part in the competition. The teams were Warwickshire, Longford, Fermanagh, Leitrim, Cavan, South Down, Tyrone and Donegal.

The winners of the 2009 Lory Meagher Cup were promoted to the 2010 Nicky Rackard Cup.

On 11 July, Tyrone won the inaugural Lory Meagher Cup, with a 5–11 to 3–16 win over Donegal at Croke Park.

Structure
The tournament had a double elimination format: each team played at least two games before being knocked out.
The eight teams played four Round 1 matches.
The winners in Round 1 advanced to Round 2A.
The losers in Round 1 went into Round 2B.
There were two Round 2A matches.
The winners in Round 2A advanced to the semi-finals.
The losers in Round 2A went into the quarter-finals.
There were two Round 2B matches.
The winners in Round 2B advanced to the quarter-finals.
The losers in Round 2B were eliminated.
There were two quarter-final matches between the Round 2A losers and Round 2B winners.
The winners of the quarter-finals advanced to the semi-finals.
The losers of the quarter-finals were eliminated.
There were two semi-final matches between the Round 2A winners and the quarter-final winners.
The winners of the semi-finals advanced to the final.
The losers of the semi-finals were eliminated.
The winners of the final won the Lory Meagher Cup for 2009.

Results

Round 1

Round 2A

Round 2B

Quarter-finals

Semi-finals

Final

Statistics

Top scorers

Overall

References

Lory Meagher Cup
Lory Meagher Cup